Lara Arruabarrena Vecino was the defending champion, but lost to Karin Knapp in the quarterfinals.
Jelena Janković won the title, defeating Paula Ormaechea in the final, 6–1, 6–2.

Seeds

Draw

Finals

Top half

Bottom half

Qualifying

Seeds

Qualifiers

Draw

First qualifier

Second qualifier

Third qualifier

Fourth qualifier

References
 Main Draw
 Qualifying Draw

Copa Sony Ericsson Colsanitas - Singles
2013 Singles